The "First Philippic" was delivered by the Athenian statesman and orator Demosthenes between 351 BC-350 BC. It constitutes the first speech of the prominent politician against Philip II of Macedon.  A philippic refers to a type of speech that is negative in tone and one that is comparable to a rant or a tirade. 

This speech is said to have been Demosthenes' first powerful speech that he made in his lifetime; his earlier speeches were weak in tone and argument, as a result of which he had to practice over the years in order to produce the First Philippic as one of his most impactful ones. 

Some scholars have debated on whether Demosthenes' philippics can be referred to as speeches, but rather "political pamphlets, cast in the form of speeches, designed for immediate effect on public opinion."  In other words, they are utilized by his allies to spread his political views. The previous author also discusses the possibility that his speeches could have been pre-prepared in advance; during preparation, Demosthenes filtered out prominent details and contextual information and only kept certain key points which he believed to have been necessary for his audience. As a result, they were not the speeches in their entirely, merely abridged versions.  This is also known as the "pamphlet theory."

Historical framework
Since 357 BC, when Philip seized Amphipolis, after agreeing in part to trade it for Pydna, Athens was formally in a state of war against the King of Macedon. In 352 BC, Demosthenes characterised Philip as the very worst enemy of his city, and a year later he criticized fiercely those dismissing Philip as a person of no account and warned them that he is as dangerous as the King of Persia. In 352 BC, the Athenian troops opposed Philip successfully at Thermopylae, but the same year the Macedonian army campaigned in Thrace and won a decisive victory over the Phocians in Thessaly, an event that shook the orator. At the same period that the King of Macedon launched his first attack against the federation of the Chalcidice and seized Stageira.

Content of the oration
The theme of the First Philippic was preparedness. Demosthenes denounces Philip on account of his conquests of Pydna, Potidaea, and Methone.  He laments the loss of these once-independent cities now under Philip's control. He calls upon the people, to whom he is addressing his philippic, to "chastise the insolence of this man."  In his rousing call for resistance, Demosthenes urged the Athenians to be ready for war and called for a great outpouring of effort. He even proposed a reform of the theoric fund ("theorika"), a mainstay of Eubulus' policy. "Theorika" were allowances paid by the state to poor Athenians to enable them to watch dramatic festivals. Eubulus passed a law making it difficult to divert public funds, including "theorika", for minor military operations. Demosthenes encouraged his countrymen, trying to convince them that the defeats they suffered were due to their mistakes and to Philip's competence. The orator opposed the use of mercenaries in the Athenian army and proposed the creation of a flexible military force, which would remain in Macedon and harass Philip's army. Despite the passionate style of the orator, it seems that the Ecclesia of Athens did not espouse his views and insisted in the ensuing military preparations, obliging Demosthenes to repeat the same argumentation in the Olynthiacs.

See also
Philippic
Second Philippic
Third Philippic

References

External links
Text of the speech at the Perseus Digital Library

Philippic
351 BC
Ancient Greek orations